Mike Schreiner  (born 9 June 1969) is a Canadian politician who has served as the leader of the Green Party of Ontario since 2009. Schreiner sits as a member of Provincial Parliament (MPP), representing Guelph; his 2018 election made him the first and only Green Party member elected to the Legislative Assembly of Ontario.

Prior to making politics a full-time career, Schreiner operated businesses that were food-related. He has been a small business advocate, entrepreneur, and food policy expert. Schreiner joined the Green Party of Ontario in 2005 and became leader in 2009, taking over from Frank de Jong. In 2018, Schreiner was elected with 45 per cent of the vote in the riding of Guelph. His election marked the first time that four different parties were elected to the Legislature since 1951. It was Schreiner's second time running in Guelph, after running in Haliburton—Kawartha Lakes—Brock and Simcoe—Grey previously.

Early life and education
Schreiner is an American-born Canadian. He was born on 9 June 1969, in WaKeeney, Kansas, the son of Barbara and Ronald Schreiner (1949–2007). He grew up on the family grain farm, helping his parents. This is where his interest in food, agriculture and the environment began.

Schreiner earned bachelor's degrees in business administration and history from the University of Kansas in 1992. He earned his master's degree in history from Indiana University Bloomington in 1994. While at Indiana University, he met his future wife, Sandy Welsh, later a sociology professor and vice provost at the University of Toronto.

After graduating from Indiana University, Schreiner and his wife moved to Toronto in 1994, and he became a Canadian citizen in 2007. He and his wife Sandy are the parents of two daughters.

Early career
Schreiner has been an entrepreneur and small business owner whose ventures have focused on sustainable food production and the local food movement. His first business was Toronto Organics that specialized in delivering food to consumers.

After moving to the Guelph area, Schreiner continued operating food distribution businesses. One company – WOW Foods – was awarded the Citizens Bank of Canada Ethics in Action Award for socially responsible business and the Toronto Food Policy Council's Local Food Hero Award. He also co-founded Earthdance Organics, a Guelph-based food production business that supplied area health food stores and farmers' markets in the early 2000s.

In 2005 Schreiner co-founded Local Food Plus, which brought "farmers and consumers together to promote financially, socially and environmentally sustainable local food systems". According to the Green Party of Ontario, he has served as a volunteer with organizations including FarmStart, the Brewer's Plate, the Toronto Food Policy Council and the Green Enterprise Ontario Steering Committee, the Canadian International Peace Project, and Toronto's Campus Community Co-op Day Care Centre.

Green Party leadership
Schreiner has been actively involved in the Green Party of Ontario (GPO) since 2004. He co-chaired the 2007 election platform committee and served as policy coordinator from 2008 to 2009. On 14 November 2009, Schreiner won the Ontario Green Party leadership election, having been acclaimed. According to the GPO, "Under Mike’s leadership the GPO has experienced substantial growth in its voters, fundraising, staff, volunteers and media exposure". Between 2009 and 2014 for example, fundraising increased from $50,000 to $500,000, all from individuals. Those achievements did not translate into success in terms of getting a seat until 2018.

Despite not holding a seat in the legislature at that time, Schreiner lobbied in favour of the price on carbon, protecting pollinators with a ban on neonicotinoids, and funding for the Experimental Lakes Area.

Early runs for office 
Schreiner first ran as a candidate for the GPO in the Haliburton—Kawartha Lakes—Brock by-election in March 2009, losing to Rick Johnson.

In the 2011 election, Schreiner ran as a candidate for Simcoe—Grey, finishing fourth behind Progressive Conservative incumbent Jim Wilson.

Schreiner was nominated as the party's candidate for Guelph in the 2014 Ontario general election, where he finished third behind winner Liz Sandals of the Ontario Liberal Party, garnering over 19% of the vote.

2018 election 
In May 2018, the Toronto Star editorial board endorsed him as the best candidate in Guelph and said that he was "the most forthright leader in the campaign for the 7 June Ontario election". He was also endorsed by the Guelph Mercury'''s editorial board in an op-ed, "Mike Schreiner is the candidate most worthy of representing Guelph provincially", citing ten reasons to vote for Schreiner.

Schreiner's campaign proved successful in a four-party race, becoming the first ever Green MPP in Ontario history. He captured 45 per cent of the vote in the Guelph riding, more than doubling the previous percentage and nearly tripling the actual number of voters for him.

Schreiner's platform for the Green Party of Ontario included the following, as summarized by the Toronto Star.

Implement more programs to help homeowners with green retrofits to save energy
Offer universal dental care and pharmacare
Set a date to phase out internal combustion engines to reduce greenhouse gas emissions
Introduce carbon pricing to discourage use of greenhouse gas-producing goods and services, with revenues returned to Ontarians as dividends
Focus health system more on illness prevention

Schreiner expanded on the platform with this comment: "I am fighting for a livable future for my children, I am fighting to tackle climate change and address income inequality, social justice issues and improving our democracy". During an interview in May 2018 he added that the Party proposed cutting payroll taxes for some small businesses to be made up for with an increased tax rate on larger businesses. Just prior to the election, he told the CBC that he hopes to see Ontario moving to 100 per cent renewable energy and was in favour of closing the nuclear power plant at Pickering. He also favoured adding mental health coverage into the Ontario Health Insurance Plan and a basic income program.

Despite efforts to convince them otherwise, Schreiner was excluded from televised leaders debates, a move the Toronto Star billed as "unfair". The publication's Ontario Politics Commentator made this comment: "This isn't the first time they have conspired to exclude the Greens, but this time the exclusion is more egregious than ever".

Following his win in the 2018 election, Schreiner was sworn into the Ontario Legislature on 5 July. Although he had been viewed by many as primarily a "green" candidate Schreiner said that his goal would be broader. "I'm going to do politics differently. I campaigned on a promise to create jobs, put people and planet first. I’m going to keep fighting for that."

42nd Parliament

During the first three months of the 42nd Parliament, he was a frequent critic of Premier Doug Ford. As a party leader, Schreiner has been extensively quoted by the news media on issues such as the government's decisions to cancel the province's cap-and-trade legislation, scrapping the green energy programs and rebates, on the tactics used by Ford to reduce the size of Toronto City Council and on the provincial plan to allow marijuana smoking in numerous locations.

He was re-elected in the 2022 Ontario general election.

Personal life
Schreiner lives with his wife Sandy and their two daughters in Toronto and in Guelph. He became a Canadian citizen in 2007.

During 2012 to 2017, he was a contributor to HuffPost'' Canada, on topics such as water protection, healthy food systems, recycling, climate change, clean tech, transit, energy and carbon pricing.

Schreiner served on the steering committee for Green Enterprise Toronto, an association of over 350 small businesses, and on the Board of Directors of FarmStart, a non-profit that assists new farmers in Ontario, and he is a governor of the Canadian International Peace Project. He is a Rotarian and volunteer on many Guelph initiatives including Hillside Music Festival, Guelph Jazz Festival, Guelph Community Clean up, Guelph Coalition for Active Transportation, and Democracy Guelph.

Electoral record

References

External links
 
 

1969 births
American emigrants to Canada
Canadian political consultants
Green Party of Ontario MPPs
Indiana University Bloomington alumni
Leaders of the Green Party of Ontario
Living people
Naturalized citizens of Canada
People from Guelph
People from WaKeeney, Kansas
University of Kansas alumni